This article contains information about the literary events and publications of 1888.

Events
February 9 – During Joseph Conrad's career at sea as Józef Teodor Konrad Korzeniowski, he departs from Bangkok for Sydney in his first command as master, on the British barque Otago. This provides a basis for his novella The Shadow Line (1916).
March 6 – On the day of Amos Bronson Alcott's funeral at Sleepy Hollow Cemetery (Concord, Massachusetts), his daughter, novelist Louisa May Alcott, already in poor health, suffers a fatal stroke.
March 16 – Foundation stone for a new National Library of Greece building is laid in Athens.
May 26 – In London, Punch magazine begins serialisation of George and Weedon Grossmith's humorous The Diary of a Nobody, the first entry being for "April 3".  
June 3 – Ernest Thayer's baseball poem "Casey at the Bat" is first published under the pen name "Phin" as the last of his humorous contributions to The San Francisco Examiner.
July – Arthur Conan Doyle's first Sherlock Holmes detective novel, A Study in Scarlet (1887), is first published separately as a book, by Ward Lock & Co in London with illustrations by the author's father, Charles Altamont Doyle.
October
The English publisher Henry Vizetelly is prosecuted in London by the National Vigilance Association and fined for obscene libel for his English translation of Zola's La Terre.
"Papus" founds the esoteric magazine L'Initiation in France.
The first book to feature Jack the Ripper in fiction is published while the Whitechapel murders attributed to Jack the Ripper are still taking place in London, the short Gothic novel The Curse Upon Mitre Square by John Francis Brewer, which features the murder of Catherine Eddowes in Mitre Square on September 30 as a key plot element.
unknown dates
Sholem Aleichem edits the first issue of the anthology Di Yidishe Folksbibliotek in Kiev, giving important exposure to young writers in Yiddish, including I. L. Peretz's long ballad "Monish".
The Finnish epic Kalevala is published for the first time in English, in a translation by American linguist John Martin Crawford.
German philosopher Friedrich Nietzsche writes Götzen-Dämmerung, oder, Wie man mit dem Hammer philosophiert ("Twilight of the Idols, or, How to Philosophize with a Hammer", published 1889), Der Antichrist (1895) and his autobiography, Ecce homo: Wie man wird, was man ist (posthumous, 1908), his last works before his total mental collapse.
probable – The sexual memoir My Secret Life by "Walter", perhaps Henry Spencer Ashbee, begins publication, being printed in Amsterdam for clandestine sale in Britain.

New books

Fiction
Grant Allen
The Devil's Die
The White Man's Foot
Edward Bellamy – Looking Backward: 2000–1887
Rolf Boldrewood – Robbery Under Arms (book publication)
Mary Elizabeth Braddon – The Fatal Three
Richard Francis Burton (translator) – The Supplemental Nights to the Thousand Nights and a Night (publication completed)
Félicien Champsaur – L'Amant des danseuses
 Archibald Clavering Gunter – Mr. Potter of Texas
Louis Couperus – Eline Vere
James De Mille – A Strange Manuscript Found in a Copper Cylinder
Antonio Fogazzaro – The Mystery of the Poet
Theodor Fontane – Irrungen, Wirrungen (On Tangled Paths)
H. Rider Haggard – Maiwa's Revenge
Thomas Hardy – Wessex Tales
Gerhart Hauptmann – Bahnwärter Thiel (Railway signalman Thiel, novella)
Henry James
The Aspern Papers
Princess Casamassima
Rudyard Kipling
The Man Who Would Be King
Plain Tales from the Hills
Amy Levy – Reuben Sachs
Jean Lombard – L'Agonie
Herman Melville – John Marr and Other Sailors
Octave Mirbeau – L'Abbé Jules
George Moore – Spring Days – A Prelude to Don Juan
Shardha Ram Phillauri – Bhagyawati
Raul Pompéia – O Ateneu
José Maria de Eça de Queiroz – Os Maias
Arthur Quiller-Couch – Troy Town
Henryk Sienkiewicz – Fire in the Steppe (Pan Wołodyjowski)
Theodor Storm – The Rider on the White Horse (Der Schimmelreiter)
Ivan Vazov – Under the Yoke (Под игото, Pod Igoto)
Lew Wallace – The Boyhood of Christ
Mrs Humphrey Ward – Robert Elsmere
Oscar Wilde – The Happy Prince and Other Tales

Children and young people
G. A. Henty
Bonnie Prince Charlie: A Tale of Fontenoy and Culloden
In the Reign of Terror: The Adventures of a Westminster Boy
George MacDonald – The Elect Lady
Robert Louis Stevenson – The Black Arrow (book publication)
Jules Verne
Family Without a Name (Famille-sans-nom)
Two Years' Vacation (Deux Ans de vacances)
Oscar Wilde – The Happy Prince and Other Tales

Drama
Sarah Bernhardt – L'Aveu, drame en un acte en prose
Félicien Champsaur – Lulu
Henrik Ibsen – The Lady from the Sea (Fruen fra havet) (written)
Alexander Kielland – Professoren
August Strindberg – Miss Julie (Fröken Julie) (written)
Leo Tolstoy, translated by Isaac Yakovlevich Pavlovsky and Oscar Méténier – The Power of Darkness, translated as La Puissance des ténèbres

Poetry
Sir Edwin Arnold (translator) – With Saʿdi in the Garden; or, The Book of Love
W. E. Henley – A Book of Verses, including first publication of "Invictus"
Andrejs Pumpurs – Lāčplēsis (The Bear-Slayer)

Non-fiction
Joseph Bertrand – Calcul des probabilités
John D. Billings – Hard Tack and Coffee
Helena Blavatsky – The Secret Doctrine
Emilia Dilke – Art in the Modern State
Esperanza (Jane, Lady Wilde) – Ancient Legends, Mystic Charms, and Superstitions of Ireland, with sketches of the Irish past
Celia Fiennes – Through England on a Side Saddle (first complete edition, written 1702)
Charles Colcock Jones, Jr. – Negro Myths of the Georgia Coast
Benjamin Hall Kennedy (primarily written by his daughter Marion Kennedy) – Revised Latin Primer
Papus – Traité méthodique de science occulte
Joseph Prestwich – Geology, Chemical and Physical, Stratigraphical and Palaeontological
A. F. W. Schimper – Die epiphytische Vegetation Amerikas (The Epiphytic Vegetation of America)
Charlotte Carmichael Stopes – The Bacon/Shakespeare Question
A. E. Waite
Lives of the Alchemystical Philosophers
The Magical Writings of Thomas Vaughan

Births
January 24 – Vicki Baum, Austrian-born writer (died 1960)
January 25 – A. L. Zissu, Romanian novelist and Zionist leader (died 1956)
February 10 – Giuseppe Ungaretti, Italian modernist poet and writer (died 1970)
April 26 – Anita Loos, American novelist and screenwriter (died 1981)
June 13 – Fernando Pessoa, Portuguese writer (died 1935)
July 23 – Raymond Chandler, American novelist and screenwriter (died 1959)
September 4 – Margaret Henley, daughter of W. E. Henley and J. M. Barrie's inspiration for the name "Wendy" in Peter Pan (died 1894)
September 22 – Lucia Mantu, born Camelia Nădejde, Romanian writer (died 1971)
September 26 – T. S. Eliot, American-born English poet and playwright (died 1965)
October 14 – Katherine Mansfield, New Zealand short story writer (died 1923)
October 16 – Eugene O'Neill, American playwright and Nobel laureate (died 1953)
October 26 – Dem. Theodorescu, Romanian novelist and journalist (died 1946)

Deaths
January 30 – Mary Howitt, English writer, poet and translator (born 1799)
March 4 – Amos Bronson Alcott, American writer and philosopher (born 1799)
March 6 – Louisa May Alcott, American novelist (born 1832)
March 14 – James Hogg, Scottish-born publisher (born 1806)
April 15 – Matthew Arnold, English poet (born 1822)
May 12 – Edward Lear, English writer of comic verse and artist (born 1812)
May 27 – Františka Stránecká, Czech writer and collector of Moravian folklore (born 1839)
August 9 – Charles Cros, French poet (born 1842)
August 20 – Henry Richard, Welsh political writer (born 1812)
September 24 – Karl von Prantl, German philosopher (born 1820)
September 30 – William Gifford Palgrave, English Arabic scholar and writer (born 1826)
November 17 – Dora d'Istria, Romanian-Albanian writer (born 1828)
December 8 – Frederick Apthorp Paley, English scholar (born 1815)
December 23 – Laurence Oliphant, Scottish travel writer and novelist (born 1829)

Awards
Newdigate prize – Arthur Waugh

References

 
Years of the 19th century in literature